This is a list of newspapers in Kyrgyzstan.

Russian language
 Delo №
 Moya Stolitsa Novosti 
 Obschestvennyi reyting
 Slovo Kyrgyzstana
 Vecherniy Bishkek
Kyrgyz language
 Agym
 Alibi
 Asaba
 Azat.kg
 De facto
 Erkin Too
 Fabula
 Kerben
 Kerege
 Kok Asaba
 Kun Darek
 Kyrgyz tuusu
 Litsa
 Mankurt Zholu
 Maydan
 Respublika
 Super-info
 Uchur
 Zaman Kyrgyzstan
 Zhany Agym
 Zhany Ordo
English language
 Bishkek Observer
 Kyrgyzstan Chronicle
 The Times of Central Asia

References

Kyrgyzstan
Newspapers